Anatole Kitain (17 September 190330 July 1980) was a Russian classical pianist.

Early life 

Anatole Kitain was born in Saint Petersburg into a family of professional musicians. His brothers, Robert and Boris, were violinists, and his brother Alexander was a pianist. He showed early promise, performing his own nocturne for the astonished Glazunov at the age of six. He began his studies in the Petersburg Conservatoire, but the political instability of the time led his family to move to Kiev, where he studied in the conservatoire with Sergei Tarnowsky. (Other pianists studying at the Kiev Conservatory at that time included Vladimir Horowitz, Alexander Uninsky and Alexander Brailowsky). In time, Kitain became the private pupil of Felix Blumenfeld, whose few private pupils also included Simon Barere and Horowitz.

Flight 

Fleeing Russia in 1923 with his family, Kitain was a prize winner in the first Franz Liszt Competition in Budapest (the competition was won by Annie Fischer). Kitain settled in France, but the outbreak of the second world war prompted him to move to the United States. However, success eluded him there. In what seems to have been an attempt to make a fresh start, he changed his name in 1944 to Alexander Karinoff, but reverted to his own name two years later. Despite a certain amount of critical success, he remained overshadowed by the ubiquitous figure of his former classmate, Horowitz.

Recordings

He made several LP recordings in the US, one with his brother Robert, and gave his last concert on 22 October 1963. He died at Orange, New Jersey in 1980.

Of his European recordings, only those made for Columbia survive. They show a pianist of consummate technique and musicality, bearing many resemblances to his exact contemporaries, Horowitz and Barere. It is curious that while the two latter went on to become household names, Kitain died in obscurity.

Reviewing the album "Anatole Kitain - The Complete Columbia Recordings 1936-39", Classic CD magazine wrote: On the evidence of these 26 titles, lovingly remastered in almost uniformly remarkable sound, here is one of the major pianists of the century... I would definitely put this important release into my Top Fifty All-time Great Piano recordings without a doubt.

This album, "The Complete Columbia Recordings, 1936-1939" is available once again (APR Records, CD, catalogue number APR6017).  See the review by Jeremy Nicholas in Gramophone magazine (August, 2015), pages 62–63.

Sources
Biographical details of Kitain are scarce, and this entry is based on Bryan Crimp's biographical essay in the APR Complete Columbia Recordings, APR 7029, and on a brief autobiography written in 1940 (see External Links)

References

Russian classical pianists
Male classical pianists
1903 births
1980 deaths
20th-century classical pianists
20th-century Russian male musicians
Soviet emigrants to France
French emigrants to the United States